Semerád is a Czech surname. Notable people with the surname include:

Australian-born Filipino-Czech twin basketball players (born 1991)
Anthony Semerad, player for the TNT KaTropa
David Semerad, player for the San Miguel Beermen
Martin Semerád (born 1990), Czech rally driver